Regishevskaya is a rural locality (a village) in Zaborskoye Rural Settlement, Tarnogsky District, Vologda Oblast, Russia. The population was 69 as of 2002.

Geography 
Regishevskaya is located 17 km southwest of Tarnogsky Gorodok (the district's administrative centre) by road. Petryayevskaya is the nearest rural locality.

References 

Rural localities in Tarnogsky District